Manfred on the Jungfrau is an 1842 oil-on-canvas painting by Ford Madox Brown. It is inspired by Act I Scene II of Lord Byron's dramatic poem Manfred, probably most particularly the following:

The painting depicts the central character of the poem, Manfred, who is a noble and wealthy aristocrat, about to toss himself from the heights of the Jungfrau mountain. Manfred is, however, saved from death by a chamois hunter who happens upon him, and who is seen approaching in the background of the painting, clad in fur.
The detail seen on Manfred's face shows his deep psychological agony, and the reason for his desire for suicide.

In 1837, John Martin painted an artwork of the same name. Martin's version was a watercolour, and focused more on the Jungfrau mountain than on the detail of Manfred and the hunter.

References

Piper, David. The Image of the Poet: British Poets and their Portraits (1982). Oxford: Clarendon P .
Swinglehurst, Edmund. The Art of the Pre-Raphaelites (1994). New York: Shooting Star P.
Encyclopædia Britannica

1842 paintings
Paintings by Ford Madox Brown
Collection of Manchester Art Gallery
Paintings about suicide